Izhevsk is the capital city of the Udmurt Republic, Russia.

Izhevsk may also refer to:
 Izhevsk Airport, an airport in the Udmurt Republic, Russia
 Izhevsk Arsenal, better known as the Kalashnikov Concern
 Izhevsk Electromechanical Plant
 Izhevsk Mechanical Plant
 Izhevsk Radio Plant
 Izhevsk railway station
 Izhevsk Reservoir
 Izhevsk Urban Okrug, a municipal formation which the city of republic significance of Izhevsk in the Udmurt Republic, Russia is incorporated as
 FC Izhevsk, former association football club from Izhevsk, Russia, active in 1936–2005
 Lada Izhevsk, a subsidiary of AvtoVAZ